Big Hill is a coastal locality in the Surf Coast Shire, Victoria, Australia.

The locality was first developed with the construction of the Great Ocean Road over the eponymous hill in 1920-21, when 100 returned soldiers were employed cutting a road through the area. The Great Ocean Road Trust opened up a subdivision of 140 allotments named the "Big Hill Estate" in 1924 to raise funding for the continued construction of the road; while these were sold, a township never developed.

A guest house, "Iluka", was built on the new road, but burned down in 1926. Nationally renowned landscape designer Edna Walling bought 12 acres of the Big Hill Estate in the late 1940s with a view to creating a village there, but decided that it would spoil the location, and built a home, "East Point", there instead. Walling moved to Queensland in 1967, and the house burned down in a bushfire the same year; the ruins are listed on the Surf Coast Shire heritage inventory.

Big Hill today is a little-developed stretch of the Great Ocean Road, with much of the locality being within the Great Otway National Park. The House at Big Hill, which won numerous architecture awards, was built there in 2011. Although the Big Hill campsite is a popular camping destination in the area, it is formally in adjacent Lorne.

References

Towns in Victoria (Australia)
Surf Coast Shire
Coastal towns in Victoria (Australia)